Alvord may refer to:

People
Alvord (surname)

Places
Alvord Desert in southeast Oregon
Alvord House in Salina, New York
Alvord Mountain in California
Alvord, California, former name of Zurich, California
Alvord, Iowa
Alvord, Texas
Alvord, West Virginia